Miodrag "Miki" Krstović (born 10 May 1950) is a Serbian actor. He appeared in more than one hundred films since 1976.

Selected filmography

1976 Vrhovi Zelengore (Partizan)

References

External links 

1950 births
Living people
Male actors from Belgrade
Serbian male film actors